QMPSB is an arylsulfonamide-based synthetic cannabinoid that has been sold as a designer drug.

QMPSB was first discovered by Nathalie Lambeng and colleagues in 2007. It acts as a full agonist of the CB1 receptor and CB2 receptor with Ki values of 3 nM and 4 nM, respectively. Many related derivatives were subsequently produced, with the main focus of this work being to increase selectivity for the non-psychoactive CB2 receptor. This work led on from an earlier series of sulfamoyl benzamide derivatives for which a patent was filed in 2004.

The quinolin-8-yl ester motif of QMPSB led to the discovery of other designer cannabinoids such as PB-22 and BB-22.

See also 

 2F-QMPSB
 5F-PB-22
 FDU-PB-22
 FUB-PB-22
 NM-2201
 O-2050
 O-2113
 SDB-005

References 

Arylsulfonamides
Cannabinoids
Designer drugs
1-Piperidinyl compounds
Quinolines